Umberto Simonetta (4 April 1926 – 25 August 1998) was an Italian playwright, writer and lyricist. He was described as "an unclassifiable artist" and "a wanderer between different genres".

Born  in Milan,  Simonetta grew up in Switzerland where his father had been forced to move as an anti-fascist.

He started his career working in couple with Guglielmo Zucconi as a radio writer and a playwright. He wrote several novels, some of them adapted into films such as Normal Young Man by Dino Risi and I viaggiatori della sera by Ugo Tognazzi. He directed the Teatro Gerolamo in Milan from 1979 until its close in 1983. As a lyricist, he often collaborated with Giorgio Gaber.

In his later years Simonetta collaborated with the newspaper Il Giornale as a theatrical critic and was one of the screenwriters
of the sitcom Nonno Felice. He died of tumor.

References

External links 

 
 

1926 births
Writers from Milan
1998 deaths
Italian lyricists
Italian television writers
Italian radio writers
20th-century Italian novelists
20th-century Italian male writers
Italian dramatists and playwrights
20th-century Italian screenwriters
Italian male screenwriters
Male television writers